Johannes (Jan) Martinus Burgers (January 13, 1895 – June 7, 1981) was a Dutch physicist and the brother of the physicist Wilhelm G. Burgers. Burgers studied in Leiden under Paul Ehrenfest, where he obtained his PhD in 1918. He is credited to be the father of Burgers' equation, the Burgers vector in dislocation theory and the Burgers material in viscoelasticity.

Jan Burgers was one of the co-founders of the International Union of Theoretical and Applied Mechanics (IUTAM) in 1946, and was its secretary-general from 1946 until 1952.

In 1931 he became member of the Royal Netherlands Academy of Arts and Sciences, in 1955 he became foreign member.

Early life and education 
Burgers was born in Arnhem, Netherlands. There he attended both primary and secondary school. He attended  Leiden University from 1914 until 1917. Burgers became a Doctor of Mathematical and Physical Sciences in 1918, writing a thesis entitled "Het Atoommodel van Rutherford-Bohr" (The Model of the Atom according to Rutherford and Bohr).

Career 
Jan Burgers took his first position out of graduate school as Conservator at the Physical Laboratory of the Teyler's Foundation. From September 1918 until October 1955, Dr. Burgers was professor of Aerodynamics and Hydrodynamics at the Delft University of Technology. He was also secretary of the Department of Mechanical Engineering and Shipbuilding (1921-1924) and later the department's chairman (1929-1931). Burgers also worked with scientists including Theodore von Karman, L. Prandt, R. von Mises, G.I. Taylor and W.F. Durand, and Paul Ehrenfest. Jan Burgers researched fluid dynamics, worked on the theory of turbulence, and explored what came to be known as the Burgers' equation. He also studied crystallography with his brother Wilhelm G. Burgers.

Burgers and his wife, Anna immigrated to the United States in 1955 where Burgers accepted a position of research professor at the Institute for Physical Dynamics and Applied Mathematics (now the Institute for Physical Science and Technology) at the University of Maryland, College Park. Burgers continued his interest in fluid dynamics while at the University of Maryland, and was recognized for his studies in gas dynamics, plasma physics, shock waves, and related phenomena. Burgers retired from the University of Maryland in 1965.

Notes

References

External links

 
 A.J.Q. Alkemade, Burgers, Johannes Martinus (1895–1981), in Biografisch Woordenboek van Nederland. 
 "Johannes Martinus Burgers; 13 January 1895 to 7 June 1981", biography at the University of Maryland
 JM Burgers Centrum
 The Burgers program for fluid dynamics at the University of Maryland
 Oral History interview transcript with Johannes Burgers on 9 June 1962, American Institute of Physics, Niels Bohr Library & Archives
 , 32nd Gibbs lecture delivered by Burgers at Philadelphia, Tuesday, 20 January 1959

20th-century Dutch physicists
1895 births
1981 deaths
People from Arnhem
Academic staff of the Delft University of Technology
Leiden University alumni
Members of the Royal Netherlands Academy of Arts and Sciences
ASME Medal recipients
University of Maryland, College Park faculty
Fluid dynamicists
20th-century American engineers
Fellows of the American Physical Society